Moneychangers may refer to :

 The Moneychangers, a 1975 novel by Arthur Hailey
 Money changer, a person or organization that exchanges the currency of one country for that of another
 The Money Changers, a 1920 American silent film
 The Moneychanger, a 2019 Uruguayan film